Horicon may refer to:
Horicon, New York
Horicon, Wisconsin